Keith Edwin Wrightson,  (born 22 March 1948) is a British historian who specialises in early modern England.

Early life and education 
Wrightson was born on 22 March 1948 in Croxdale, County Durham, England. He was educated at Dame Allan's School, an all-boys private school in Newcastle upon Tyne, England. He studied history at Fitzwilliam College, Cambridge, graduating with a Bachelor of Arts (BA) degree in 1970 and a Doctor of Philosophy (PhD) degree in 1974. His doctoral thesis was titled "The Puritan reformation of manners, with special reference to the counties of Lancashire and Essex, 1640-1660".

Academic career 
Wrightson began his academic career as a research fellow in history at Fitzwilliam College, Cambridge from 1972 to 1975. He then moved to the University of St Andrews where he was a lecturer in modern history from 1975 to 1984. He returned to Cambridge in 1984 having been elected a fellow of Jesus College, Cambridge and appointed a university lecturer in history. He was promoted to Reader in English Social History in 1993 and to Professor of Social History in 1998.

Wrightson has taught at the University of St Andrews, University of Cambridge and Yale University.

Wrightson is currently the Randolph W. Townsend Professor of History at Yale University.

Honours 
In 1996, Wrightson was elected a Fellow of the British Academy (FBA), the United Kingdom's national academy for the humanities and social sciences. He is also an elected Fellow of the Royal Historical Society (FRHistS). Wrightson was formerly the President of the North American Conference on British Studies. Wrightson is the recipient of the John Ben Snow Prize.

Bibliography 

His notable books include:

 
 
 A Social History of England, 1500-1750

References

External links
Official Website

Living people
People educated at Dame Allan's School
Alumni of Fitzwilliam College, Cambridge
Yale University faculty
1948 births
Academics of the University of St Andrews
Fellows of Jesus College, Cambridge
Fellows of Fitzwilliam College, Cambridge
Social historians